Glabrennea is a genus of air-breathing land snails, terrestrial pulmonate gastropod mollusks in the family Streptaxidae.

Distribution 
The distribution of the genus Glabrennea includes:
 the Seychelles

Species
Species within the genus Glabrennea include:
 Glabrennea gardineri (Sykes, 1909)
 Glabrennea silhouettensis (Verdcourt, 1994)
 Glabrennea thomasseti (Sykes, 1909)

References

Streptaxidae